Sky Cinema Due HD is a high-definition satellite television channel on the Sky Italia platform in Italy. Sky Cinema Cult HD, channel 302, supersedes the standard-definition Sky Cinema Due, channel 332.

Sky Cinema Due was originally called Cult Network Italia (CNI); in 2006, the name was shortened to Cult. In 2012, the channel was rebranded to Sky Cinema Cult and in 2018 to Sky Cinema Due.

Following its launch in 1998, Cult Network Italia was twice named Best Thematic Cultural Arts Channel in Europe at the Annual European Satellite Awards.

See also
 Sky Cinema
 Television in Italy

References

External links 
 Sky Cinema Cult HD channel guide 
 CULT 
 

Italian-language television stations
Television channels in Italy
Television channels and stations established in 2006
Sky television channels